The Huánuco Province is one of 11 provinces of the Huánuco Region in Peru. The capital of the province is the city of Huánuco.

History

Geography 
Some of the highest mountains of the province are listed below:

Political division
The province is divided into twelve districts.

 Amarilis (Paucarbamba)
 Chinchao (Acomayo)
 Churubamba (Churubamba)
 Huánuco (Huánuco)
 Margos (Margos)
 Pillco Marca (Cayhuayna)
 Quisqui (Huancapallac)
 San Francisco de Cayrán (Cayrán)
 San Pedro de Chaulán (Chaulán)
 Santa María del Valle (Santa María del Valle)
 Yacus
 Yarumayo (Yarumayo)

Ethnic groups 
The province is inhabited by indigenous citizens of Quechua descent. Spanish is the language which the majority of the population (75.97%) learnt to speak in childhood, 23.74% of the residents started speaking using the Quechua language (2007 Peru Census).

Events
On 21 December 2005, eight Peruvian policemen were killed by Shining Path terrorists. The policemen were involved in the government's efforts of destroying coca crops.

On 19 November 2009, Peruvian policemen reported apprehending gang members suspected of killing people in Huanuco Province for their fat and selling the fat on the black market for use in cosmetics in Europe.  Three suspects confessed to killing 5 people and told the police that the fat was worth $60,000 a gallon.  At least 60 people are reported missing this year in Huanuco Province.

See also
 Administrative divisions of Peru
 Aqumayu
 Coca eradication
 Killa Rumi
 Qiwllaqucha
 Tuna Mach'ay
 Wanakawri

References

External links

  www.huanuco.mp.gob.pe Official province web site

Provinces of the Huánuco Region